63 (sixty-three) is the natural number following 62 and preceding 64.

In mathematics
63 is:

 a deficient composite number

 a highly cototient number.
 a number of the form 2n − 1 (with n = 6), but it is not a Mersenne prime since n is not prime and 63 is certainly not prime either. It is the only number in the Mersenne sequence whose prime factors are each factors of at least one previous element of the sequence.
 a Woodall number i.e. of the form 2nn − 1 with n = 4.
 the third Delannoy number.
 the sum of the powers of 2 from 0 to 5.
 palindromic and a repdigit in bases 2 (1111112), 4 (3334), 8 (778), 20 (3320) and 62 (1162).
 a centered octahedral number.
 there are 63 posets with 5 unlabeled elements.
 a Harshad number.

In science
 The atomic number of europium.

Astronomy 
 Messier object M63, a magnitude 8.5 galaxy in the constellation Canes Venatici, also known as the Sunflower Galaxy.
 The New General Catalogue object NGC 63, a spiral galaxy in the constellation Pisces

In other fields
Sixty-three is also:
 The code for international direct dial calls to the Philippines
 The hull number of the U.S. Navy's aircraft carrier USS Kitty Hawk (CV-63) and the USS Missouri (BB-63)
 The number of the French department Puy-de-Dôme
 The number of groats in a guinea in British pre-decimal currency
 A card game, popular in Carleton County, New Brunswick
 The Stoner 63, a machine gun
 The number of chromosomes found in the offspring of a donkey and a horse
 Class of '63 was a TV movie starring James Brolin (1973)

In sports
 Tom Dempsey of New Orleans Saints, Nov. 8, 1970, Jason Elam of the Denver Broncos, Oct. 25, 1988, Sebastian Janikowski of the Oakland Raiders, Sep. 12, 2011 and David Akers of the San Francisco 49ers, Sept. 9, 2012 had NFL record 63-yard field goals
 Michael Jordan scored a record 63 points in a Chicago Bulls–Boston Celtics (double-overtime) NBA playoff game on April 20, 1987
 In U.S. college athletics, schools that are members of NCAA Division I FCS are allowed to provide their football players with athletically-related financial aid equivalent to a total of 63 full athletic scholarships in a given season.
 Cricketer Phillip Hughes died during a match whilst on a personal score of 63 runs.

In religion
 There are 63 Tractates in the Mishna, the compilation of Jewish Law.
 There are 63 Saints (popularly known as Nayanmars) in South Indian Shaivism, particularly in Tamil Nadu, India.
 There are 63 Salakapurusas (great beings) in Jain cosmology.

References

Integers